Kissanelämää is the third solo studio album by a Finnish singer-songwriter Aki Sirkesalo. Released by Sony Music Entertainment in 1998, the album peaked at number five on the Finnish Albums Chart.

Track listing

Chart performance

References

1998 albums
Aki Sirkesalo albums
Sony Music albums